This article lists the tallest buildings in  Metro Cagayan de Misamis in the southern island of Mindanao in the Philippines.

Tallest completed buildings

This includes spires and architectural details but does not include antenna masts. If there is no data available, the list ranks building according to the number of floors.

In Progress buildings
Only highrises and midrises are included in this list.

Others
Other upcoming projects, such as townships and mixed-use developments in the city that contains medium- to high-rise buildings but no info yet.

See also
List of tallest buildings in Asia
List of tallest buildings in the Philippines

List of tallest buildings in Davao City

References

Cagayan de Oro
Tallest buildings